Africa is a quarterly peer-reviewed academic journal published by Cambridge University Press on behalf of the International African Institute. The journal takes an interdisciplinary approach considering the humanities, social sciences, and environmental studies in Africa. Every year there is a special issue treating a specific theme.

Africa is currently edited by Wale Adebanwi, Deborah James and David Pratten.

Abstracting and indexing 
The journal is abstracted and indexed in the MLA International Bibliography, the European Reference Index of Research Journals in the Humanities, and the Social Sciences Citation Index. According to the Journal Citation Reports, the journal has a 2009 impact factor of 0.592, ranking it 37th out of 68 journals in the category "Anthropology" and 14th out of 44 in the category Area Studies. By 2011 the figures were an impact factor of 0.604, 11th out of 66 Area  Studies journals and 42nd out of 79 journals in the Anthropology category. In 2012 the Impact Factor was 0.855 ranking the journal in the top ten of the Area Studies category. Africa remains the top  anthropology/ethnography journal in Area Studies and the 3rd African studies journal in the same category.

References

External links 

 
 Africa at Project MUSE

African studies journals
Publications established in 1928
Cambridge University Press academic journals
English-language journals
Quarterly journals